Warrenton is a city in Warren County, Missouri, United States. The population was 7,880 according to the 2010 Census. It is the county seat of Warren County.  Warrenton is an exurb of St. Louis, and is located in the St. Louis Metropolitan Statistical Area. Warrenton's slogan is "A City for All Seasons."

History
Warrenton had its start in the 1830s as a planned community which was to hold the county seat. The community took its name from Warren County. The United States Postal Service Post Office in Warrenton has been in operation since 1836.

The Ernst Schowengerdt House and Warren County Courthouse and Circuit Court Building are listed on the National Register of Historic Places.

Activities
Warrenton has several parks open for the enjoyment of residents. An athletic complex is home to little league soccer, baseball, softball, and tee ball. Binkley Woods Park and Spectator Lake offer walking trails, fishing accessibility, a small playground and barbecue grills. Dyer Park offers playgrounds, basketball hoops, and tennis courts, as well as an outdoor stage for concerts and other events. Khoury Park has two baseball fields, basketball hoops, and a playground. Morgan Park offers a tennis court, playground, sand volleyball area, and the Warrenton Pool.

The city has recently opened an additional park that features an indoor pool, dog-friendly trails, walking trails, and a Frisbee golf course.

The Belle Starr Theatre also holds several concerts and events each year. Warrenton High School (part of the Warren County R-3 district) offers a variety of activities open to the public, including musicals, plays, band and choir concerts, and sporting events.

Festivals and events 
FrühlingFest

One Saturday in June, the Warrenton Downtown Association hosts FrühlingFest, a festival that celebrates the region's German heritage. The festival includes German food, vendors of local handmade and artisan products, and other family activities.

Warrenton Fall Festival

One Saturday in September, the city closes Main Street and hosts the Fall Festival, which includes a diverse group of street vendors, food trucks, kid's activities, a car show, and main stage music entertainment. Past music acts have included the Ozark Mountain Daredevils, Little River Band, Nitty Gritty Dirt Band and regional cover band Butch Wax & The Hollywoods.

Hometown Christmas

To kick off the Christmas season, the City of Warrenton hosts Hometown Christmas, an evening that includes an official tree lighting, Christmas carols, choir performances at Friedens United Church of Christ, hot chocolate, cookies, a visit by Santa, as well as a decoration event held at the Warren County Historical Society & Museum.

Geography
Warrenton is located at  (38.815951, -91.140164).

Climate

Demographics

2010 census
As of the census of 2010, there were 7,880 people, 2,927 households, and 1,969 families living in the city. The racial makeup of the city was 93.9% White, 2.1% African American, 0.6% Native American, 0.7% Asian, 0.1% Pacific Islander, 0.9% from other races, and 1.8% from two or more races. Hispanic or Latino of any race were 3.7% of the population.

There were 2,927 households, of which 39.6% had children under the age of 18 living with them, 47.0% were married couples living together, 15.1% had a female householder with no husband present, 5.2% had a male householder with no wife present, and 32.7% were non-families. 27.1% of all households were made up of individuals, and 12.5% had someone living alone who was 65 years of age or older. The average household size was 2.61 and the average family size was 3.17.

The median age in the city was 32.4 years. 29.1% of residents were under the age of 18; 8.8% were between the ages of 18 and 24; 28.2% were from 25 to 44; 21.1% were from 45 to 64; and 12.8% were 65 years of age or older. The gender makeup of the city was 47.9% male and 52.1% female.

2000 census
As of the census of 2000, there were 5,281 people, 1,985 households, and 1,363 families living in the city. The racial makeup of the city was 95.64% White, 1.70% African American, 0.42% Native American, 0.38% Asian, 0.04% Pacific Islander, 0.57% from other races, and 1.25% from two or more races. Hispanic or Latino of any race were 1.29% of the population.

There were 1,985 households, out of which 37.9% had children under the age of 18 living with them, 50.8% were married couples living together, 13.6% had a female householder with no husband present, and 31.3% were non-families. 26.5% of all households were made up of individuals, and 10.9% had someone living alone who was 65 years of age or older. The average household size was 2.59 and the average family size was 3.14.

In the city, the population was spread out, with 30.0% under the age of 18, 9.4% from 18 to 24, 30.3% from 25 to 44, 16.8% from 45 to 64, and 13.6% who were 65 years of age or older. The median age was 32 years. For every 100 females, there were 88.4 males. For every 100 females age 18 and over, there were 85.7 males.

The median income for a household in the city was $53.742, and the median income for a family was $68.740. Males had a median income of $36,809 versus $22,662 for females. The per capita income for the city was $16,431. About 8.0% of families and 10.6% of the population were below the poverty line, including 11.4% of those under age 18 and 15.1% of those age 65 or over.

Economy
Warrenton has direct access to both rail and interstate traffic via Interstate 70. Manufacturing consists of light industry, a copper foundry which is no longer run, and several quarries in the area. The town's primary sources of external revenue are service facilities for travellers. A notable company in Warrenton is SAF Holland. Warrenton is also home to the global headquarters of Child Evangelism Fellowship

Warren County R-III School District is the largest employer in Warren County.

In 2018, the city of Warrenton opened a second I-70 overpass, about 2 miles west of the original State Road 47 overpass. This was completed to account for future growth in the city.

Education
Warrenton and the adjacent city of Truesdale, Missouri are home to the Warren County R-III School District, which is fully accredited in the state of Missouri.  The district currently has six buildings:  Warrenton High School, Daniel Boone Elementary, Warrior Ridge Elementary, Rebecca Boone Elementary, Black Hawk Middle School, Central office/ Early Childhood center.

Warrenton is also home to Holy Rosary School, a small Catholic school serving children in Kindergarten through eighth grade.

The Central Wesleyan College was an important German-American institution from 1864 to 1941.  After closing, one of the campus buildings burned on February 17, 1957 killing 72 persons in the Warrenton Nursing Home Fire.

Warrenton has a public library, a branch of the Scenic Regional Library system.

Media
KFAV, 99.9 MHz FM station featuring country music, sister station to KWRE
KWRE, 730 kHz AM station with 95.1 MHz FM translator K236CK featuring country music, sister station to KFAV

Notable people
George H. Middelkamp, 24th State Treasurer of Missouri

References and notes

External links
 The City of Warrenton, Missouri
 Historic maps of Warrenton in the Sanborn Maps of Missouri Collection at the University of Missouri

Cities in Warren County, Missouri
Cities in Missouri
County seats in Missouri